This is a list of notable rail trails in the United States.

Multi-State 
 East Coast Greenway
 Great Allegheny Passage
 Great American Rail-Trail
 Yellowstone Branch Line Trail

Alabama 
 Chattahoochee Valley Railroad Trail
 Chief Ladiga Trail
 Hillsboro Trail
 Horse Creek Trail
 Marion Walking Trail
 Old Railroad Bed Trail
 Richard Martin Trail
 Robertsdale Trail
 Swayback Bridge Trail
 Vulcan Trail

Alaska 
 Chase Trail
 Iditarod National Historic Trail
 Tony Knowles Coastal Bicycle Trails

Arizona 
 Apache Railroad Trail
 Indian Springs Trail
 Iron King Trail
 Mohave and Milltown Railway Trails
 Peavine Trail
 Sonoita Creek Railroad Trail

Arkansas 
 Arkadelphia's Feaster Trail
 Big Spring Nature Trail
 Delta Heritage Trail
 Hazen Trail
 Hot Springs Creek Greenway
 Levee Walking Trail
 Little Rock's River Trail
 Marvell Bike Trail
 Old Railroad Trail
 Ouachita National Recreation Trail
 Ozark Highlands Trail

California 
 Bizz Johnson Trail in Lassen County, accessible from Susanville.
 Colton Ave. rail-trail, runs approximately 1.7 miles along Colton Ave. and Inland Center Drive in Colton and San Bernardino on former Pacific-Electric right-of-way
 Duarte Bike Trail, spans 1.6 miles from Buena Vista Street to Vineyard Avenue in Duarte, using a portion of Pacific Electric's former Glendora line
 El Dorado Trail
 Fairfield Linear Park
 Great Redwood Trail
 Great Shasta Rail Trail
 Iron Horse Regional Trail
 Joe Rodota Trail  pedestrian/bicycle path, using the former Petaluma and Santa Rosa Railroad line between Santa Rosa and Sebastopol
 Los Angeles Metro Expo Line
 Marina Green pedestrian/bicycle path, using the portion of the former San Francisco Belt Railroad west of Fort Mason
 Mount Lowe Railroad Trail
 Ohlone Greenway
 Orange Blossom Trail, runs approximately 1.3 miles on former Santa Fe "kite-shaped track" right-of-way in Redlands
 Pacific Electric Trail, spans 19.5 miles from Claremont to Rialto, using a portion of Pacific Electric's former San Bernardino line
 Richmond Greenway
 Santa Clara River Trail
 Sonoma–Marin Area Rail Transit
 South San Francisco Centennial Way
 Three Creeks Trail
 Union Pacific Railroad right of way in Brea
 Ventura River Parkway Trail  pedestrian/bicycle/equestrian path, using the former Ventura and Ojai Valley Railroad line between Ventura and Ojai
 Walnut Trail
 West County Trail  pedestrian/bicycle path, using the former Petaluma and Santa Rosa Railroad line between Sebastopol and Forestville

Colorado 
 Alpine Tunnel
 DRGW Aspen Branch
 Rock Island Trail
 Switzerland Trail
 Manitou Incline is the remains of a former 3 ft (914 mm) narrow gauge funicular railway with an average grade of 45% (24°) and as steep as 68% (34°) in places.

Connecticut 
 Airline State Park
 Farmington Canal Trail
 Hop River State Park Trail
 Larkin Bridle Path
 Meriden Linear Trail
 Moosup Valley State Park Trail
 Ridgefield Rail Trail
 Shepaug Greenway

Delaware 
 Junction and Breakwater Trail

Florida 
 Auburndale TECO Trail
 Blackwater Heritage State Trail
 Boca Grande Bike Path, a  trail in Boca Grande, Florida on Gasparilla Island
 Cady Way Trail
 Cape Haze Pioneer Trail
 Chain of Lakes Trail
 Cross Town Trail
 Florida Keys Overseas Heritage Trail
 Fort Fraser Trail
 Gainesville-Hawthorne Trail State Park 
 General James A. Van Fleet State Trail
 Good Neighbor Trail
 Hardy Trail
 Jacksonville-Baldwin Rail Trail
 John Yarbrough Linear Park
 Legacy Trail (Florida)
 Palatka-to-St. Augustine State Trail
 Pinellas Trail
 Punta Gorda Linear Park
 Seminole-Wekiva Trail
 South Dade Rail Trail
 South Lake Trail
 Tallahassee-St. Marks Historic Railroad Trail State Park
 Upper Tampa Bay Trail
 West Orange Trail
 Withlacoochee State Trail

Georgia 
 Atlanta BeltLine
 Columbus Fall Line Trace
 Firefly Trail
 Silver Comet Trail

Idaho 
 Ashton to Tetonia Trail
 Bill Chipman Palouse Trail
 Ed Corkill Trail
 Latah Trail
 Route of the Hiawatha mountain bike trail
 Trail of the Coeur d'Alenes
 Weiser River Trail
 Wood River Trail
 Yellowstone Branch Line Trail
 Victor to Driggs Rail Trail

Illinois 
 Bloomingdale Trail, Wicker Park, Chicago
 Burnham Greenway, Chicago
 Constitution Trail, Bloomington-Normal
 Great Western Trail, Chicago area
 Green Bay Trail, North Shore suburbs of Chicago
 Illinois Prairie Path, Chicago and vicinity.
 Interurban Trail, Springfield to Chatham
 Jane Addams Trail, Freeport to the Wisconsin state line
 Kickapoo Rail Trail, Urbana to Kickapoo State Recreation Area near Danville
 Long Prairie Trail, Boone County
 Lost Bridge Trail, Springfield to Rochester
 Nickel Plate Trail, New Douglas to Pontoon Beach
 Old Plank Road Trail, Joliet to Chicago Heights
 Pecatonica Prairie Path, Freeport to near Rockford
 Pennsy Greenway, Lansing
 Rock Island Trail State Park, Peoria to Toulon
 Sangamon Valley Trail, Springfield
 Schoolhouse Trail, Madison to Troy
 Skokie Valley Trail, Sauganash community of Chicago to Highland Park
 Stone Bridge Trail: Rockton to the Boone County line
 Tunnel Hill State Trail, Harrisburg to Karnak
 Wabash Trail, Springfield
 Watershed Trail, Roxana to Edwardsville

Indiana 
 B-Line Trail, Bloomington
 B&O Trail, Brownsburg to Indianapolis via Speedway
 Cardinal Greenway, Richmond to Marion via Muncie
 Coal Line Trail, South Bend
 Erie Lackawanna Trail, Hammond to Crown Point
 Indiana-Michigan River Valley Trail (includes LaSalle Trail), Greater South Bend
 Monon Trail, Indianapolis and northern suburbs
 Nickel Plate Trail, Northern Indiana
 Oak Savannah Trail, Griffith to Hobart
 Panhandle Pathway, Cass and Pulaski Counties
 Pennsy Trail, Indianapolis to Greenfield via Cumberland
 Prairie Duneland Trail, Portage to Chesterton
 Pufferbelly Trail, Fort Wayne, Indiana
 Pumpkinvine Nature Trail, Elkhart and Lagrange Counties

Iowa 
 Cedar Valley Trail
 Chichaqua Valley Trail
 Great Western Trail
 Heart of Iowa Nature Trail
 Heritage Trail
 High Trestle Trail, formerly Ankeny to Woodward Trail
 Krushchev in Iowa Trail, formerly Corn Diplomacy Trail
 Raccoon River Valley Trail
 Summerset Trail
 Wabash Trace Nature Trail

Kansas 
 Blue River Rail Trail
 Flint Hills Nature Trail
 Haskell Rail Trail
 Landon Trail
 Prairie Spirit Trail State Park
 Välkommen Trail, entirely within the city limits of Lindsborg

Kentucky 
 Big Four Bridge
 Dawkins Line Rail Trail, from Hagerhill to Royalton; when phase two is completed, the trail will extend into Breathitt County
 Paducah and Louisville Rail Trail, connecting Greenville and Central City

In planning/under construction 
 C&O Rail Trail, from Lexington to Coalton
 K&I Bridge, would utilize the former and now abandoned automobile lanes

Louisiana 
 Tammany Trace, 31 mile trail on the north shore of Lake Pontchartrain

Maine 
 Calais Waterfront Walkway
 Down East Sunrise Trail (Ellsworth—Calais)
 Eastern Promenade Trail (Portland)
 Eastern Trail (Kennebunk—South Portland)
 Kennebec River Rail Trail (Augusta—Gardiner)
 Mountain Division Trail (Oxford County and Cumberland County)
 Papermill Trail (Lisbon)
 Passy Rail Trail (Belfast)

Maryland 
 Allegheny Highlands Trail of Maryland
 Baltimore & Annapolis Trail
 Bethesda Trolley Trail
 Capital Crescent Trail, Maryland and Washington, DC
 Chesapeake Beach Railway Trail
 College Park Trolley Trail
 Cross Island Trail
 Easton Rails-to-Trails
 Indian Head Rail Trail
 Lower Susquehanna Heritage Greenway Trail
 Ma and Pa Trail
 Poplar Avenue Trail, Annapolis (part of former Baltimore and Annapolis Railroad)
 Savage Mill Trail
 Three Notch Trail
 Torrey C. Brown Rail Trail, formerly Northern Central Railroad Trail
 Trolley Line Number 9 Trail
 Washington, Baltimore and Annapolis Trail
 Wayne Gilchrest Trail
 Western Maryland Rail Trail

Massachusetts

Michigan

Minnesota

Mississippi 
 Longleaf Trace, Hattiesburg to Prentiss (41 miles)
 Oxford Depot Trail and South Campus Rail Trail
 Tanglefoot Trail, Houston to New Albany (43.6 miles)

Missouri 
 Al Foster Trail in west St. Louis County
 Grant's Trail, near Grant's Farm
 Katy Trail, the longest rail trail in the United States
 MKT Trail, Columbia
 Rock Island Trail State Park
 Frisco Highline Trail

Montana 
 Centennial Trail (Montana)
 Olympian Trail
 Route of the Hiawatha bike trail
 Yellowstone Branch Line Trail

Nebraska 
 Cowboy Trail
 Great Plains Trail Network

Nevada 
 Historic Railroad Hiking Trail

New Hampshire 
 Ashuelot Rail Trail
Cheshire Rail Trail
 Common Pathway
 Concord-Lake Sunapee Rail Trail
 Cotton Valley Rail Trail
 Derry Rail Trail
 East Coast Greenway
 Farmington Recreational Rail Trail
Fort Hill Rail Trail
 Goffstown Rail Trail
 Granite Town Rail Trail
 Hillsborough Recreational Rail Trail
 Industrial Heritage Trail
 Lake Winnisquam Scenic Trail
 Londonderry Rail Trail
 Nashua River Rail Trail
 New Boston Rail Trail
 Northern Rail Trail
 Piscataquog Trail
 Rockingham Recreational Trail
 South Manchester Rail Trail
 Sugar River Recreational Trail (Concord and Claremont Railroad)
 Windham Rail Trail
 WOW Trail

New Jersey

New Mexico 
:Category:Rail trails in New Mexico

New York

North Carolina 
 Charlotte Rail Trail
 American Tobacco Trail
 Railroad Grade Road, a 10-mile paved former section of the VA Creeper Railroad from Todd to Fleetwood
 Thermal Belt Rail Trail
 Neuse River Trail

In planning/under construction 
 Ecusta Trail (Brevard to Hendersonville)

Ohio 
 Bike & Hike Trail, Summit County
 Camp Chase Trail, Franklin and Madison Counties
 Chippewa Rail Trail, Medina County
 Cleveland Foundation Centennial Lake Link Trail, Cleveland
 Conotton Creek Trail, Harrison County
 Freedom Trail, Summit County
 Galena Brick Trail, Delaware County
 Genoa Township Trail, Delaware County
 Greenway Corridor / Maple Highlands Trail, Lake and Geauga Counties (tandem)
 Heart of Ohio Trail, Knox County
 Hockhocking Adena Bikeway, Athens County
 Holmes County Trail, Holmes County
 Iron Horse Trail, Montgomery County
 Iron Horse Trail, Stark County
 Kokosing Gap Trail, Knox County
 Little Beaver Creek Greenway Trail, Columbiana County
 Little Miami Bike Trail
 Marion Tallgrass Trail, Marion County
 Mohican Valley Trail, Knox County
 Moonville Rail-Trail, Vinton and Athens Counties
 Morgana Run Trail, Cleveland
 North Coast Inland Trail, Lorain County
 Ohio to Erie Trail, Cincinnati to Columbus to Cleveland
 Pymatuning Valley Greenway Trail, Ashtabula County
 Richland B & O Trail, Richland County
 Sippo Valley Trail, Wayne and Stark Counties
 University/Parks Trail, Lucas County
 Wabash Cannonball Trail, Williams County, Fulton County, Lucas County, and Henry County 
 Western Reserve Greenway Trail, Ashtabula County

In planning/under construction 
 B&O Trail, Athens County; ten miles of recently purchased former B&O railroad grade in the eastern county; a Washington County group (MATAC) is working on an extension into Washington County
 Owl Creek Trail, Knox County

Oregon 
 Banks–Vernonia State Trail
 Crown Zellerbach (CZ) Trail 
 Deschutes River Trail
 OC&E Woods Line State Trail
 Row River National Recreation Trail
 Springwater Corridor
 Trolley Trail

Pennsylvania

Rhode Island 
 Blackstone Valley Rail
 East Bay Bike Path
 Narragansett Pier Railroad right of way
 William C. O'Neill Bike Path
 Providence, Hartford and Fishkill railroad right of way
 Trestle Trail, the unpaved section of the Coventry Greenway that extends to the Connecticut border
 Washington Secondary Bike Path / Rail Trail, commonly referred to as Cranston Bike Path, Warwick Bike Path, West Warwick Bike Path and Coventry Greenway

South Carolina 
 Doodle Trail, Pickens County, connects the towns of Easley and Pickens; opened in 2015
 North Augusta Greeneway, North Augusta
 Savannah Valley Railroad Trail, northwest of McCormick to Willington
 Swamp Rabbit Trail, Greenville County
 Triple C Rail Trail, a  rail trail spanning Cherokee and York counties
 West Ashley Greenway, Charleston
 Peak to Prosperity Passage of the Palmetto Trail, Newberry County, South Carolina
 Wateree Passage of the Palmetto Trail, Sumter County, South Carolina

In planning/under construction 
 Spanish Moss Trail, northern Beaufort County; the initial three miles (of 20 miles proposed) of trail have been completed, using previous Port Royal Railroad right-of-way, currently owned by BJWSA

South Dakota 
 George S. Mickelson Trail

Tennessee 
 Cumberland River Bicentennial Trail, a trail that runs from downtown Nashville to Ashland City
 Railroad Grade Road, a five-mile long paved road/trail; a former section of the old East Tennessee and Western North Carolina line west of Roan Mountain
 Shelby Farms Greenline, a 6.6 mile trail using the previous CSX Rail right-of-way in Shelby County; an additional 7 miles are planned.
 Tennessee Central Trail, a  trail currently connecting Cookeville and Algood, with future plans to extend to Monterey and Baxter
 Vollintine and Evergreen (V&E greenline), a 1.7 mile trail using the former L&N Rail right-of-way in Memphis

In planning/under construction 
 Greater Memphis Greenline, a system of trails in the Memphis area
 The Tweetsie Trail, a ten-mile trail connecting Johnson City and Elizabethton over the route of the old ET&WNC line; the first 7.1-mile section opened in August 2014

Texas 
 Caprock Canyons State Park and Trailway, a 64.25 mile trail 100 miles southeast of Amarillo
 Denton Branch Rail Trail, 8 mile trail
 Harrisburg-Sunset Trail, 5 mile trail in Houston
 Katy Trail, a 3.5 mile recreational trail that runs along the abandoned right-of-way of the Missouri-Kansas-Texas (Katy) Railroad in Dallas
 Lake Mineral Wells State Trailway, a 20-mile trail 50 miles west of Fort Worth
 MKT Hike and Bike Trail, 6 miles, Houston Heights
 Northeast Texas Trail, 130 miles under construction with 70 non-continuous miles open, between Farmersville (20 miles east of DFW metroplex) and New Boston (Arkansas border)

In planning/under construction 
 Columbia Tap, 4 miles, Houston

Utah 
 Denver & Rio Grande Western Rail Trail, 23.5 miles along the former D&RGW right of way in Davis County
 Historic Union Pacific Rail Trail State Park, 28 miles along the Union Pacific Railway between Park City and Echo Reservoir
 Porter Rockwell Trail, 3.5 miles along the Union Pacific Railway, Draper & Sandy
Provo River Parkway Trail, about 6.6 miles of Rio Grande Western Railway (Heber Creeper) from Provo River Bottoms to Vivian Park in Provo Canyon

In planning/under construction 
 Parley's Trail, 8 mile trail between Sugar House and the Jordan River, mostly along the D&RGW Sugar House Branch corridor

Vermont 
 Cross Vermont Trail
 Delaware & Hudson Rail-Trail
 Island Line Trail
 Lamoille Valley Rail Trail
 Missisquoi Valley Rail Trail

Virginia 
 Bluemont Junction Trail
 Chessie Nature Trail
 Dahlgren Railroad Heritage Trail
 High Bridge Trail State Park
 Huckleberry Trail
 Jackson River Scenic Trail
 New River Trail
 Virginia Capital Trail, 2 mile portion near downtown Richmond, of 52 miles total.
 Virginia Central Railway Trail
 Virginia Creeper Trail
 Warrenton Branch Greenway
 Washington & Old Dominion Railroad Trail
 Wilderness Road State Park

In planning/under construction 
 Blue Ridge Railway Trail
 Blue Ridge Tunnel
 Dahlgren Railroad Heritage Trail
 Fall Line Trail

Washington

Washington, D.C. 
 Capital Crescent Trail, Maryland and Washington, DC
 Metropolitan Branch Trail, Maryland and Washington, DC

West Virginia

Wisconsin 
 400 State Trail
 Ahnapee State Trail
 Badger State Trail
 Bearskin State Trail
 Bugline Trail
 Capital City State Trail
 Chippewa River State Trail
 Devil's River State Trail
 Duck Creek Trail
 Eisenbahn State Trail
 Elroy-Sparta State Trail
 Friendship State Trail (Partial)
 Fox River State Recreational Trail
 Gandy Dancer Trail
 Glacial Drumlin State Trail
 Great River State Trail
 La Crosse River Trail
 Lake Country Trail
 Military Ridge State Trail
 Mountain-Bay State Trail
 Newton Blackmour State Trail
 Old Abe State Trail
 Omaha Trail
 Osaugee Recreational Trail
 Ozaukee Interurban Trail
 Pine Line Trail
 Red Cedar State Trail
 Saunders State Trail
 Sugar River State Trail
 Tri-County Recreational Corridor
 Tuscobia State Trail
 White River State Trail
 Wild Goose State Trail

Wyoming 
 City of Casper Trail System, includes several miles of former Union Pacific rail line converted to concrete and gravel paths stretching from the downtown area, east into Evansville

References 

Long-distance trails in the United States
Rail trails in the United States
 
United States